Carl Abou Samah (born April 18, 1979), better known by his stage name Karl Wolf, is a Lebanese-Canadian musician based in Toronto, Ontario, Canada. He has been a singer, songwriter, and producer since 2001, releasing his first solo album Face Behind the Face on MapleNationwide/Universal in 2006, followed by a second album Bite the Bullet in 2007. His third album Nightlife was released in 2009 followed by Finally Free in 2012, Stereotype in 2014 and WOW in 2015. His biggest hit has been a remake of Toto's "Africa" sampling from the song and providing new lyrics and arrangements. Through his company, Lone Wolf Management, Karl Wolf also manages a number of new artists. In 2015, he announced a new collaboration under the name BAE (Be All Equal) with Show Stephens, Brenda Mullen and producer MasterTrak. Wolf signed a new solo contract in Canada with British Columbia-based Cordova Bay Records as well as two new worldwide deals in Los Angeles, one for a publishing contract with BMG and another Digital "YouTube" deal with Collective Digital Studios. He co-wrote the OMI hit "Hula Hoop".

Early years
Wolf was born as Carl Abou Samah in Beirut, Lebanon. He came from a musical household. His mother was a piano instructor and his father played the oud, derbake and guitar. He moved on with his family to Sharjah, UAE when he was three years old due to the civil war in Lebanon. He studied in the UAE. In an interview with Shave Magazine, Karl explained that in Arabic, his family name (Abou Samah) means 'father of forgiveness'. His stage name 'wolf' comes from a nickname he received on his high school basketball team because he was the smallest and quickest in his team. He also says his mother and father drove him to a career in music. Wolf's mother was a piano teacher and his father played guitar, drums, and the traditional Middle Eastern oud.

At 16, Wolf immigrated to Canada in 1995, residing in Montreal, Quebec. He studied Film Studies at Montreal's Concordia University. He began his career "behind the scenes," and has been writing co-producing since 2001. Initially he was a backup singer for some hits by the Quebec band Dubmatique. The 2001 hit album from Gabrielle Destroismaisons generated two singles co-written by him that reached No. 1 on the BDS Francophone Charts, and the record earned him a Félix Award at the L'ADISQ Awards for "Best Mix and Sound of the Year".

Wolf's work with Gabrielle brought him to the attention of Antoine Sicotte, of the top-selling Canadian pop band Sky, where he was recruited as a singer-songwriter becoming Sky's new lead singer in 2002. Wolf co-wrote and co-produced the third Sky album, Picture Perfect (on Sextant/EMI), with strong airplay across Canada. Sicotte and Wolf cooperated on the hugely successful Star Académie reality TV show in Quebec. The subsequent album was the biggest-selling album in Canada in 2003, notching a phenomenal sales in Canadian terms and earning Karl Wolf a SOCAN Award for Most Popular Song. A Star Académie II sequel in 2004 was another big success, the album going double-platinum.

Solo years (since 2005)

In 2005, Wolf ventured into a solo career. He released his debut solo album Face Behind the Face" in January 2006. Since its release, the album broke in the Canadian Top 100 sales chart and spawned three singles, "Butterflies". and "Desensitize",

Wolf followed with a second studio album Bite the Bullet in November 2007. The first single release from the album was "Africa", a remake of the worldwide hit Africa by Toto. The Karl Wolf remake features Canadian artist Culture. In early March 2009, with the release of the single on iTunes for digital downloads, it surged up from No. 32 to No. 2 on the issue of March 14, 2009 based on huge numbers of downloads over the previous week. It peaked at No. 1 on the iTunes charts and It also stayed at No. 2 for four further week on the chart of March 21 and 28 and April 4 and 11, 2009. Prior to iTunes download, it had topped at No. 20 in the same chart. This is so far Karl Wolf's most successful single to date. The song also topped the MuchMusic Top 30 Countdown charts and has also found success in Japan, peaking at No. 20 on the Japan Hot 100 chart. His follow-up single this year titled "Carrera" climbed to peak at No. 39 on the Billboard Canadian Hot 100.

Nightlife, his third album was released on November 17, 2009.

After nine years with EMI Music, in March 2010 he signed a new recording contract in the United States with Universal Republic followed by a worldwide deal with Universal Music Canada in 2011. EMI Japan and EMI Middle East who still had exclusive license to Karl Wolf's upcoming album released Finally Free, his fourth album on July 10, 2012. Through his company, Lone Wolf Management, Karl Wolf also manages a number of new artists.

In September 2014, he released the album Stereotype followed in 2015 with the album WOW.

In April 2021, he released his tenth album 2AM Vibes with a number of collaborations.

Lone Wolf Management / LW Entertainment / LW Records
In addition to his solo career, Wolf has established "LW Entertainment" and his own record label "LW Records" and recording studio (with LW standing for Lone Wolf).

Through his company, Lone Wolf Management, Karl Wolf also manages a number of new artists with his long time manager Pascal Malkoun.

Karl Wolf has also produced for Quebec singers Mitsou, Emily, Jérôme-Philippe (aka Disoul) also becoming for a time, part of the latter's band Dubmatique.

BAE (Be All Equal)
In 2015, Karl Wolf announced a collaboration under the name BAE (Be All Equal) that includes Karl Wolf and hip-hop artist Show Stephens and singer-songwriter Brenda Mullen. Co-produced by Wolf and DJ producer MasterTrak, the act is signed to Armin Van Buuren's Armada Music label. The formation's first single is "I'm Lonely". Karl Wolf and BAE were included as one of the opening acts for renowned singer Akon's 2015 Canada-wide tour which also included acts like Peter Jackson and Afrocen3

Collaborations
Karl Wolf has collaborated with a number of artists, mainly from Canada. Choclair was featured in one of his earliest hits titled "Desensitize" and Canadian rapper Culture is featured in his biggest hit "Africa", whereas Rime and Kaz Money are featured in "Yalla Habibi". Sway was featured in "Hurting" and Kardinal Offishall was featured in "Ghetto Love". His single "Fuck Shit Up / Mash It Up" produced by Greg Stainer & Dany Neville featured Three 6 Mafia, Timbaland and B K Brasco in "Magic Hotel" and Fatman Scoop in "Let's Get Rowdy".

Also in 2015, Karl Wolf co-wrote with Omar Pasley (OMI), Jenson Vaughan and Matthew Humphrey OMI's international single "Hula Hoop", a follow-up to OMI's hit "Cheerleader".

Making a comeback in 2020, Karl Wolf collaborated with up and coming artist Raeshaun and was featured on the track "Dubai" in July, paying homage to the city and country that took him and his family in during the Civil War in Lebanon.

In popular culture
 Karl Wolf was a featured artist on the Arabic version of Star Academy broadcast on Lebanese Broadcasting Corporation (LBC). In the fifth season of the show, he was seen mentoring the contestants. Some joined him for renditions of his hits, including "Butterfly" and "Africa"
 In 2011, he organized a Close Up Arabia campaign for recruiting participants in a music video project of his. and the resulting music video.
 Karl Wolf has also collaborated and performed in concerts with Akon, Ne-Yo, T-Pain and many more artists and as a special guest also. He co-wrote with Jenson Vaughan, Frank Bülles, Matthew Humphrey and Omar Pasley (OMI) the latter's international hit "Hula Hoop".

Discography

Studio albums

Compilation albums

Extended plays

Singles

Others
2007: "Hollow Girl" (feat. Striger)
2007: "Butterflies" (with Eve)
2008: "Like This" (feat. Sandman)
2009: "Maniac Maniac" (feat. Culture)
2009: "You Forgot About Me" (feat. Imposs)
2009: "No Way Nobody" (feat. Loon)
2011: "Tell Me" (feat. Nirvana Savoury)
2013: "Go Your Own Way" (feat. Reema Major)

Featured artist

Awards and nominations

References

External links
 Karl Wolf Official site
 Karl Wolf MySpace Page
 Karl Wolf Fan Page on Facebook

1979 births
Living people
21st-century Canadian male singers
Canadian contemporary R&B singers
Canadian expatriates in the United Arab Emirates
Canadian male singers
Canadian male singer-songwriters
Canadian pop singers
Canadian soul singers
EMI Records artists
English-language singers from Lebanon
Lebanese emigrants to Canada
Lebanese expatriates in the United Arab Emirates
MTV Europe Music Award winners
Musicians from Beirut
Musicians from Toronto
Singers from Montreal
Songwriters from Quebec
Universal Records artists